People belonging to Hindu Lingayat Burud Caste are mostly native of Maharashtra & Karnataka (India). Burud is derived from a Sanskrit word "Buruda". Buruda in Sanskrit means "a basket-maker, mat-maker". People of this caste are recognized by their traditional occupation of bamboo crafting. In the old days, Buruds (people belonging to the Burud Caste) were dependent on bamboo crafting for their livelihood. They used bamboo to prepare different articles like mats, ladders, baskets. With increase in population and growing popularity of plastic/metallic articles, bamboo-based livelihood is no more viable.

History

Bamboo articles

बुरूड 

बनवितो आम्ही चटई, बास्केट आणि वडगा
समाजाला संस्कृत मध्ये नाव आहे बुरुडा
घेऊ आम्ही भरारी जसे की गरुड 
आम्ही जातीचे बुरूड आम्ही जातीचे बुरूड...  

पर्यावरणाचे रक्षणावर आहे आमचे उदरनिर्वाह 
गुगल देवतेलाही नाही आमची पर्वाह
महाराष्ट्र बांबू बोर्डाने वाढविले आमचे गरुर 
आम्ही जातीचे बुरूड आम्ही जातीचे बुरूड... 

प्रगत होणार आम्ही घेतला आहे ध्यास 
याबाबत जोरात सुरू आहेत प्रयास 
जगणार नाही आम्ही जसे जगते झुरूड 
आम्ही जातीचे बुरूड आम्ही जातीचे बुरूड...   
 
श्री. रिमोद खरोले,
नागपूर

References 
Matrimonial Website for Burud Community : www.jodidaar.in
Tribes and Castes of the central Provinces of India , Vol 2 By R.V Russell, pg 208 to 212
Tribes and Castes of the central Provinces of India  By R.V Russell pg 208 to 212
The Tribes and Castes of Bombay  By Reginald Edward Enthoven pg 254 to 257
The Castes and Tribes of H.E.H the Nizam's Dominions  By Syed Siraj ul Hassan pg 135 to pg 136

Website 
[https://www.shadii.com

Indian castes